Mirjam Jaeger (German: Mirjam Jäger, ; born 9 November 1982 in Zürich) is a Swiss former freestyle skier. Now she concentrates on her modeling and sports broadcaster career.

Background and early years
Mirjam Jaeger was born in Zurich, Switzerland, surrounded by Alps, where she learned to ski at an early age. Although she grew up skiing, she learned how to snowboard when she was still a kid, and snowboarding quickly became her new passion.

In 1991, she tried snowboarding and started doing regional halfpipe competitions at the age of 16, finding the first sponsors to be able to compete. She competed in one Halfpipe World Cup and a few Europa Cups in Snowboarding, and while balancing her academic studies, she was able to ski and snowboard. It wasn't until 2004 that she put aside her snowboard to focus on freeskiing only.

Competitions
She gave her World Cup debut in skiing Halfpipe in 2004 in Les Contamines, France, where she finished in 6th place. Between 2006 and 2013 she's had 3 podium finishes in World Cups. Two 2nd places in Les Contamines, France in 2006 and 2008 and a 3rd place in Cardrona, New Zealand in 2013. Her best finishes in the overall Halfpipe World Cup Ranking are a 2nd place in the 2005/2006 season, a 5th place in the 2012/2013 season and the 4th place in the 2013/2014 season.

She also has two other important silver medals: one from the Winter X Games XII in Aspen, CO in 2008, and the other one from the Winter Dew Tour in Breckenridge, CO in 2011.

Half-pipe skiing made its Olympic debut at the 2014 Winter Olympics in Sochi, Russia, where she reached the final and finished in eighth place.

In 2015, January, after getting injured in World Champs 2009, 2011 and 2013, she won the Bronze Medal at the FIS Feestyle Ski and Snowboarding World Championships in Kreischberg. In February she participated at the "Russian Freestyle Games", competing in both slopestyle and halfpipe, reaching 5th place in slopestyle and winning the halfpipe competition.

Mirjam Jäger retired from competition 24 March 2015.

See also
Freestyle skiing at the 2014 Winter Olympics

Appearances
During the closing ceremony of the Olympic Games in Sochi , in the all countries parade of athletes, she was the first athlete to be framed by the cameras (min 3:18).

Results

Winter Olympics

World Championships

Winter X Games 
 Silver Medal at Winter X Games 2008 in Aspen, .

Winter Dew Tour 
 Silver Medal at Winter Dew Tour 2011 in Breckenridge, .

Russian Freestyle Games 
 Gold Medal at Russian Freestyle Games 2015 in Miass, discipline Halfpipe.

Model
In her modeling career, after being subject to various advertising campaigns for sports equipments such as skis, boots, glasses, overalls etcetera, Mirjam was the cover girl of the German language edition of Maxim for Germany, Austria, and Switzerland in February 2014, and was also featured in the February 2014 issue of Maxim Thailand  as well as the March 2014 issue of ''Maxim'' Australia.

She has also finished in 3rd place in the Maxim Hot 100 Switzerland list in 2013, being the only athlete finishing within the Top 20.

Television
In the summer of 2014, she participated as a contestant on the TV series "Stable Wars Del Mar" (season 2) in the team along with Nanci Dahl and Karen Headley.
The TV series started to broadcast on Fox Sports San Diego on Monday, 10 November 2014.

In June 2015 Mirjam  debuted as a sports broadcaster for Blick.ch. She presented talk shows and sports events. She also broadcast the election of the Olympic cities 2024 & 2028 for The Olympic Channel live from Lima, Peru in 2017 as well as the election of the Olympic city 2026 live from Lausanne, Switzerland in 2019.

She is also one of the two main characters in the Olympic Channels documentary “Running in North Korea” filmed in 2019.

Personal life
Mirjam Jaeger has two kids and was engaged to Rafael Beutl, Model and Swiss Bachelor (TV show) of 2014, who is also the father. They announced their  split in January 2022.

Notes

References

External links
 
 
 
 
 
 

1982 births
Living people
Swiss female freestyle skiers
Olympic freestyle skiers of Switzerland
Freestyle skiers at the 2014 Winter Olympics
X Games athletes
Sportspeople from Zürich
21st-century Swiss women